Havana is an album by American pianist Dave Grusin released in 1990, recorded for the GRP label. This album is a soundtrack to the film Havana, directed by Sidney Pollack.

This soundtrack was a 1990 Academy Award nominee for Best Original Score, a 1990 Golden Globe nominee for Best Original Score, and a 1990 Grammy nominee for Best Score Soundtrack for Visual Media.

Track listing 
All tracks written by Dave Grusin except where noted
"Main Title" – 3:05
"Night Walk" – 3:26
"Cuba Libre ('Se Fue')" – 3:32
"Santa Clara Suite: Vayase" - 1:36
"Santa Clara Suite: Miliocia y Refugios" – 1:45
"Santa Clara Suite Fuego Peligroso" – 0:59
"Santa Clara Suite: Epilogue" - 0:54
"A Los Rumberos de Belén" (Roberto Nunez) – 3:56
"Love Theme" – 3:09
"Hurricane Country" – 5:01 
"Lost in a Sweet Place" – 2:39
"Mambo Lido" – 3:34
"El Conuco" – 3:14
"Adios Habana" – 3:07
"La Academia" – 2:48

 Dori Caymmi - Vocals
 Dave Grusin – piano, keyboards
 Arturo Sandoval – trumpet
 Sal Marquez – trumpet
 Don Menza – saxophone
 Dave Valentin – flute
 Clare Fischer – piano
 Lee Ritenour – guitar
 Brian Bromberg – bass
 Abraham Laboriel – bass
 Harvey Mason – drums
 Alex Acuña – percussion
 Gary Vinci – concertmaster

References

External links
Dave Grusin-Havane soundtrack at Discogs
Official webpage
AllMusic review

1990 albums
Dave Grusin soundtracks
GRP Records albums
Drama film soundtracks